Zdravko Brkljačić (born 22 May 1936) is a former Croatian football goalkeeper who played in several clubs in Yugoslavia, Austria and Belgium.

Club career
Born in Varaždin, he started playing in NK Lokomotiva. However, he failed to break into the starting eleven, so he moved to FK Velež Mostar where he had a busy two seasons. In 1959 he moved to FK Vojvodina where he stayed for a year and a half. He played with NK Karlovac before moving to Dinamo Zagreb where he stayed three seasons as a substitute goalkeeper; he played only one match in the Yugoslav First League with them.  Afterwards, he moved abroad, first playing one season in Austria with Wiener Sport-Club, and then to Belgium where he played seven years in top flight clubs K.A.A. Gent and Standard Liège.  He played one match for the Yugoslav U-21 team.

References

External sources
 

1936 births
Living people
People from Varaždin
Association football goalkeepers
Yugoslav footballers
NK Lokomotiva Zagreb players
FK Velež Mostar players
FK Vojvodina players
NK Karlovac players
GNK Dinamo Zagreb players
Wiener Sport-Club players
K.A.A. Gent players
Standard Liège players
Yugoslav First League players
Austrian Football Bundesliga players
Belgian Pro League players
Yugoslav expatriate footballers
Expatriate footballers in Austria
Yugoslav expatriate sportspeople in Austria
Expatriate footballers in Belgium
Yugoslav expatriate sportspeople in Belgium